The Reynard 97D is an open-wheel formula race car, designed and developed by Malcolm Oastler, and constructed and built by Reynard Motorsport, for use in both the Japanese Formula Nippon, and later the Australian Formula Holden series, in 1997.

References 

Open wheel racing cars
Reynard Motorsport vehicles
Super Formula